Chandrakant Baliram Sonawane is a member of the 13th Maharashtra Legislative Assembly. He represents the Chopda Assembly Constituency. He belongs to the Shiv Sena party.

Personal life

Political career

He is convicted by Dhule District Court for Jalgaon housing scam of 1996.

Positions held
 2013: Elected as Corporator in Jalgaon Municipal Corporation 
 2014: Elected to Maharashtra Legislative Assembly
 2015: Elected as Director of Jalgaon District Central Co-operative Bank

See also
 Raver Lok Sabha constituency
 Jalgaon Lok Sabha constituency

References

Maharashtra MLAs 2014–2019
Living people
Shiv Sena politicians
Marathi politicians
Year of birth missing (living people)